Hekani Jakhalu Kense (born after 1976) is an Indian politician and social entrepreneur from Nagaland. She set up the non-governmental organization YouthNet to help the youths of Nagaland pursue business opportunities. She was recognised with the Nari Shakti Puraskar award in 2018. In 2023, She along with Salhoutuonuo Kruse became the first women from Nagaland to be elected to the Nagaland Legislative Assembly.

Early life 
Hekani Jakhalu was born in Dimapur, Nagaland. She was educated at Bishop Cotton Girls' School in Bengaluru and earned a bachelor's degree in political science at Lady Shri Ram College in Delhi. She then studied for a Bachelor of Laws at the University of Delhi and took a Master of Laws at the University of San Francisco.

Career 
After working in the United States, Jakhalu returned to Delhi and began a career as a lawyer. She was made a partner in the firm but having seen firsthand the number of young people from Nagaland migrating to Delhi, she decided in 2006 to move to Kohima (the capital of Nagaland) in order to set up a non-governmental organization (NGO) called YouthNet which aims to create more opportunities for the youth of Nagaland. As of 2018, YouthNet had 30 employees and claims to have helped 23,500 people. It aims to help entrepreneurs pursue their ideas and set up a "Made in Nagaland" centre in Kohima which sells their artisan goods. After running for two years, the "Made in Nagaland" centre opened an e-commerce platform in 2020.

In recognition of her work, Hekani Jakhalu received the Nari Shakti Puraskar award in 2018, which is India's highest civilian award given only to women. She was the only person from the northeast of India to be honoured that year.

References

External links 

People from Kohima
People from Dimapur
21st-century Indian women lawyers
21st-century Indian lawyers
Nari Shakti Puraskar 2018 winners
Indian social entrepreneurs
Lady Shri Ram College alumni
Delhi University alumni
University of San Francisco alumni
Living people
Naga people
1976 births